Since 1984 the Governor of Punjab has acted as the administrator of Chandigarh. His official residence is Raj Bhavan, Punjab in Chandigarh.

Chief Commissioners

Administrators of Chandigarh

See also

 Governors in India

References
 http://www.worldstatesmen.org/India_states.html

External links
 

Chandigarh Administrators
Chandigarh-related lists
Chandigarh
 
Chandigarh